Boughton is a hamlet in Lincolnshire, England. It is in the civil parish of Asgarby and Howell.

External links

Hamlets in Lincolnshire
North Kesteven District